Kučevište is the largest village in the municipality of Čučer-Sandevo, North Macedonia.

Demographics
As of the 2021 census, Kučevište had 4,119 residents with the following ethnic composition:
Macedonians 2,404
Serbs 1,323
Persons for whom data are taken from administrative sources 180
Bosniaks 84
Others 74
Albanians 18
Vlachs 15
Turks 14
Roma 7

According to the 2002 census, the village had a total of 3,167 inhabitants. Ethnic groups in the village include:
Serbs 1,654
Macedonians 1,460
Bosniaks 1
Romani 4
Aromanians 15
Others 33

References

Villages in Čučer-Sandevo Municipality
Serb communities in North Macedonia